Hathor 3 - Coptic Calendar - Hathor 5

The fourth day of the Coptic month of Hathor, the third month of the Coptic year. On a common year, this day corresponds to October 31, of the Julian Calendar, and November 13, of the Gregorian Calendar. This day falls in the Coptic season of Peret, the season of emergence.

Commemorations

Saints 

 The martyrdom of Saint John and Saint James the Bishops of Persia 
 The martyrdom of Saint Thomas the Bishop 
 The martyrdom of Saint Epimachus and Saint Adrianus

References 

Days of the Coptic calendar